W. B. Nelson State Recreation Site is a state park in Lincoln County, western Oregon.

It is on the lower Alsea River, near the coastal city of Waldport.

The park is administered by the Oregon Parks and Recreation Department.

See also
 List of Oregon state parks

References

External links
 

State parks of Oregon
Parks in Lincoln County, Oregon
Alsea River